Vazgen Ignatovich Manasyan (born 13 March 1958) is a Tajikistani professional football coach and a former player. He is of Armenian origin.

Club career
He made his professional debut in the Soviet First League in 1980 for Pamir Dushanbe.

References

External links

1958 births
Sportspeople from Dushanbe
Tajikistani people of Armenian descent
Living people
Soviet Armenians
Soviet footballers
Association football forwards
Tajikistani footballers
Tajikistan international footballers
CSKA Pamir Dushanbe players
FC Zenit Saint Petersburg players
FC Vorskla Poltava players
FC Nyva Myronivka players
Soviet Top League players
Russian Premier League players
Ukrainian First League players
Tajikistani expatriate footballers
Tajikistani expatriate sportspeople in Russia
Tajikistani expatriate sportspeople in Ukraine
Tajikistani expatriate sportspeople in Uzbekistan
Expatriate footballers in Russia
Expatriate footballers in Ukraine
Tajikistani football managers
FC Chernomorets Novorossiysk managers
FC Stal Kamianske managers
PFC Lokomotiv Tashkent players
Tajikistani expatriate football managers
Expatriate football managers in Russia
Expatriate football managers in Ukraine
Expatriate football managers in Uzbekistan
Ethnic Armenian sportspeople